William Sandham may refer to:
 William Sandham (rugby) (1879–?), Welsh rugby union and rugby league player
 William Sandham (footballer) (1898–1963), English footballer